The Bulgarian Second Professional Football League, also known as Second League or Vtora liga, is the second level of the Bulgarian football league system, below First League and above the Third League. Sixteen teams take part in the league, each playing twice against all the other, once home and once away. Most matches are played on Saturdays and Sundays. The league is administered by the Bulgarian Professional Football League.

In 2016, the B Group's name was rebranded to Second Professional Football League.

Competition format
A team receives 3 points for a win and 1 point for a draw. No points are awarded for a loss.

Promotion and relegation positions
For 2021–22 Season :
 First place (champion) to Third place: Direct promotion to  First Professional Football League.
 Fourth place: Promotion playoff against the 13th place team from First Professional Football League.
 19th to 20th place: Relegation to  Third Amateur Football League.

2022–23 clubs

History

B Republican Football Group
The B group was established in 1950 when the league was divided in two groups - North and South, in each group participating 10 teams. The first champions of the B Republican Football Group are Torpedo (Ruse) (North) and Spartak (Sofia) (South).

In season 1951 the group is only one - B Republican Football Group with 12 teams. The regulations are - in A Group are going the top team in the final standings from Sofia and the top two teams from the province (teams that aren't from Sofia).

In the next season 1952 the group is formed by 14 teams and from season 1953 the league is divided into five groups - Sofia B Group, North-West B Group, South-West B Group, North-East B Group and South-East B Group.

Second Professional Football Group
In the next seasons the league had many changes. In 2000 the Bulgarian Football Union changed the name of the division.
The league is formed by 18 teams, not like previous seasons - 16 teams. To reduce the teams to 16 again in the next season the last six teams that finish in the final standings in the league were directly relegated.

First Professional Football League
Before the start of season 2001/2002 the league was again renamed. The championship started with 13 teams, because Lokomotiv (Plovdiv) and Belasitsa (Petrich) united with two teams from A Group - Lokomotiv with PFC Velbazhd Kyustendil and Belasitsa with PFC Hebar Pazardzhik. That meant, that this was the end of professional football in the towns of Kyustendil and Pazardzhik.

B Professional Football Group
Returning to the traditions of the B Republican Football Group was the creating of the B Professional Football Group. 16 teams participated in the league, each playing twice against all the other, once home and once away, with no play-offs.

Before the start of season 2005/2006 the Bulgarian Football Union decided to divide B Group in two groups - West B Group and East B Group with 14 teams in each group. Every team plays 13 matches as home team and 13 matches as away team. The two champions of the groups were directly promoted to A Group and the two teams that finished in second place in their group played a play-off for winning the final third place for promotion in A Group. On May 19, 2008 the two groups were extended to 16 teams. For season 2010/2011 the two groups were reduced again with 12 teams in each.

But just before the start of season 2011/2012 the number of teams in the two groups was again reduced - 10 teams in both West B Group and East B Group, with the winners of the groups directly promoting to A Group. The two teams that finished in second place in their group enter in a play-off for winning a place at the final play-off for promotion/relegation with the team that finished 14th in A Group.

Further changes were made before the start of season 2012/2013. The former format of B Group with the two groups (West and East) was replaced by a single division, formed by fourteen teams.

Second League

Former champions (from season 2005–06)
The following table presents the former champions of B Group (until season 2011–12 it had separate champions about the zones East and West).

References

 
2
Bulgaria
Professional sports leagues in Bulgaria